Serenades of the Netherworld is the second album released by Dutch guitarist Sander Gommans's project HDK (Hate, Death, Kill). "Revelation" and "Return from Tomorrow" were released as single tracks, while the entire album itself entered stores on 1 September 2014.

Track listing

Personnel 
HDK
Sander Gommans (ex–After Forever, Trillium, Kiske/Somerville) – guitars, bass, recording, producing
Amanda Somerville (Trillium, Avantasia, Kiske/Somerville) – female vocals
Geert Kroes (Dead Man's Curse, BlindSight) – clean male vocals, growls, cover artwork
Koen Herfst (Bagga Bownz, I Chaos, Dew–Scented, Armin van Buuren) – drums
Uri Dijk (Textures) – keyboards

Guests musicians
Mark Burnash – bass on tracks 2–4
Paul Owsinski – lead guitar on track 8
Stephen Pursey – guitar solos on track 2
Erik van Ittersum (Insomnia, Ethereal) – keyboards on tracks 8 and 9

Production
Joost van den Broek (Sun Caged, ex–After Forever) – mixing
Jos Driessen – mastering

References

2014 albums
HDK (band) albums